Daegu Cyber University is an accredited South Korean online university.  Its physical headquarters is located near Daegu in neighboring Gyeongsan City, North Gyeongsang province in South Korea.

Daegu Cyber University is specialized in courses for psychology, special education, therapy, and social work, etc. And it was the first accredited online university by Korean Ministry of Education in Gyeongsang province in South Korea.

The current president is Kun Yong Rhee (이근용), who has served since the school's foundation. Although administratively distinct, the university has close ties with Daegu University.

Academics

Courses offered        
Department of Special Education
Department of Art Therapy
Department of Speech Language Pathology
Department of Behavior Therapy
Department of Play Therapy
Department of Counseling Psychology
Department of Clinical Psychology
Department of Social Welfare
Department of Social Welfare Counseling
Department of Rehabilitation Counseling
Department of Public Administration
Department of Electronic & Information Communication Engineering
Department of Korean Language and Multicultural Studies
Department of Influencer

History

The school was opened in 2002 that is part of the Yeong Gwang School Academy founded by Reverend Seongsan Rhee Young Shik with his founding spirit of "Love, Light, and Freedom."

Sister schools

A cooperative graduate program is offered with Nova Southeastern University, in the United States.

See also
List of colleges and universities in South Korea
Online education
Distance education
Education in South Korea

External links
Official school website, in Korean
Official school website, in English

Universities and colleges in North Gyeongsang Province
Distance education institutions based in South Korea
2002 establishments in South Korea
Educational institutions established in 2002